Henry Clifford Allison (8 February 1932 – 7 April 2005) was a British racing driver from England, who participated in Formula One during seasons  to  for the Lotus, Scuderia Centro Sud, Ferrari and UDT Laystall teams.  He was born and died in Brough, Westmorland (now Cumbria).

Formula Three and Sports Cars
Cliff Allison started his racing career in a Formula Three Cooper 500 in 1953 before being spotted by Colin Chapman.  Allison won the performance prize driving a 744cc Lotus in the 1957 24 Hours of Le Mans. The Lotus of Allison and Colin Chapman finished sixth in the 1958 12 Hours of Sebring endurance race for sports cars. Allison came in fourth with his Lotus in the 1958 Grand Prix of Europe at Spa-Francorchamps, more than four minutes behind victor Tony Brooks.

Allison and Dan Gurney shared one of three team Ferrari cars that competed in the June 1959 1000 km Nürburgring race. Seventy-five cars entered the 1000 kilometre race which was a world championship event for sports cars.

Allison was paired with Jean Behra in a Ferrari which finished second in the 1959 12 Hours of Sebring. The drivers received $1,500 in prize money. Allison was credited with the fastest lap of the Sebring race in the No. 9 Ferrari. He was clocked at 3 minutes 21.6 seconds on the 97th lap of the 5.2-mile course.

In May 1960 Allison skidded off the road during practice for the Targa Florio in Palermo, Sicily. His Ferrari had reached a speed of 100 miles per hour when a tyre burst, or so the driver believed. The car crashed into a scrub forest, destroying itself and most of what it touched. When the mishap occurred the Ferrari was nearing the end of a five-mile straight by the sea. This was the only very fast stretch of road in the event. Allison escaped from the wreck without a scratch, but his face was ashen and his mouth hung open with an expression of fear.

Formula One Lotus (1958, 1961), Ferrari (1959–60)
Allison was forced to make numerous pit stops during the 1958 Monaco Grand Prix. His Lotus finished sixth, 12 laps behind race winner Maurice Trintignant. However this marked the first World Championship point for Team Lotus.

Ferrari's stable of drivers for 1959 were Olivier Gendebien, Phil Hill, Brooks, Behra, Gurney, and Allison.

For the 1959 Monaco Grand Prix the Ferrari factory team fielded truncated versions of the cars they ran in future grand prix races. At Monte Carlo the Ferraris' long sleek snouts (air scoops) were cut away to allow more air into the cooling systems. Wolfgang von Trips lost control of his Porsche in a bend where the street was steeply inclined to Casino. Allison's Formula 2 Ferrari crashed into him as he spun. The Lotus of Bruce Halford came next into the blind curve and became part of the wreck. Allison and his Ferrari suffered the least damage while von Trips sustained a gashed face, and Halford had a cut to his arm. None of the three cars could continue.

He suffered a major crash behind the wheel of his Ferrari while practising for the 1960 Monaco Grand Prix, and it took him almost the rest of the year to recover from his injuries. Allison was hurt when his Ferrari slammed into a straw barrier. He was unconscious when he was taken to a hospital. Allison sustained a broken left arm, rib fractures, facial cuts, and a concussion. He was listed in serious condition.

The following year he suffered another crash at the wheel of his Lotus in practice for the 1961 Belgian Grand Prix. He broke both his knees and fractured his pelvis when his car careened off the course and overturned in a field.

Post-Formula One career
This marked the end of his career in motor sport. He kept in touch with the sport through reunions and was always a popular visitor to the paddock.

Allison owned and managed Allison's Garage in Brough. The business had been started by his father and he returned to it after his racing career ended. Allisons also provided the village and school bus services, which Cliff Allison would drive.

Complete Formula One World Championship results
(key)

References

External links
 Cliff Allison profile at The 500 Owners Association

1932 births
2005 deaths
English racing drivers
English Formula One drivers
Ferrari Formula One drivers
Scuderia Centro Sud Formula One drivers
Team Lotus Formula One drivers
British Racing Partnership Formula One drivers
24 Hours of Le Mans drivers
World Sportscar Championship drivers